The 2021 PGCBL season is the tenth season of the Perfect Game Collegiate Baseball League, a wood bat collegiate summer baseball league. The league's first since the 2019 season after the 2020 season was canceled due to the COVID-19 pandemic.

The league split into three divisions of East, Central, and West of five, four (five including Adirondack), and six teams respectively. The league added the Batavia Muckdogs, Auburn Doubledays, and Niagara Power during the off-season. However the day prior to the regular season beginning, due to COVID-19 complications the Adirondack Trail Blazers canceled their season. Thus lowering the league to 15 teams for the season and the Central division from five teams to four. Also, the Jamestown Jammers officially rebranded as the Jamestown Tarp Skunks starting in the 2021 season. While there was supposed to be 48 games for every team in the league, not all of them were played due to rainouts or cancellations.

Regular season standings
Current through July 29, 2021.

 As of July 29, 2021.

 y – Clinched division
 x – Clinched playoff spot
 e – Eliminated from playoff contention

Statistical leaders
as of July 29, 2021

Hitting

Pitching

Playoffs

Description of playoffs
The postseason for the 2021 season includes a playoff field of six teams, where the two teams with the best records would get a bye for the first round. The quarter-final round is a one-game playoff series where the 4th seed hosts the 5th seed and the 3rd seed hosts the 6th seed. The semi-final round is a one-game playoff series where the 1st seed will host the winner of the 4th and 5th seed series, and the 2nd seed will host the winner of the 3rd and 6th seed series. Finally, in the PGCBL Championship series, it is a best of 3 series between the two remaining teams from the semi-final round with the higher seed hosting game 1 and 3 (if necessary) and the lower seed hosting game 2.

Playoff bracket

See also
 Perfect Game Collegiate Baseball League

References

External links
 

PGCBL season
PGCBL season
Impact of the COVID-19 pandemic on sports